Newhouse Farmhouse, Llanvetherine, Monmouthshire is a farmhouse dating from the late-16th century. It is a Grade II* listed building. Its associated barns and stable block have their own Grade II listings.

History
The architectural historian John Newman dates the farmhouse to the late 16th century, describing it as “much altered”. Cadw suggests a somewhat later date for the main block, of 1600. Sir Cyril Fox and Lord Raglan, in their three-volume history Monmouthshire Houses, record 17th century extensions and alterations. Cadw attributes the parlour range to 1635.

Architecture and description
The farmhouse is constructed of rubble stone, with a slate roof, replaced in the 20th century. It is of two-storeys, with gables. Newhouse Farm is a Grade II* listed building. Its two barns and the associated stable block have their own Grade II listings.

Notes

References 
 
 

Grade II* listed buildings in Monmouthshire
Farmhouses in Wales
Grade II* listed houses in Wales